Bahram Hooshyar (1938–1991) was a commander of the Islamic Republic of Iran Air Force (IRIAF) and an important strategist in the Iran–Iraq War.

Operations

Attack on H3
General Hooshyar had a key role along with Major General Javad Fakouri in the Attack on H3 (Attack on Al-Waleed).

Operation Samen-ol-A'emeh
He not only was involved in designing Operation Samen-ol-A'emeh, but also General Hooshyar was an innovator of Iran's plan for launching missile in battle.

Innovations
He for first time established and started Khyber missile site (Foley Islamabad) along with some armored divisions operating Qazvin.

Death
He died in Tehran in 1991 after a long battle with cancer. Like many soldiers serving in the Iran-Iraq War, he was diagnosed with leukemia. His sculpture at the Museum of the Air Force is on display as one of Iran's symbols of the Iran–Iraq War.

References

1938 births
People from Tehran
Islamic Republic of Iran Air Force personnel
Islamic Republic of Iran Army personnel of the Iran–Iraq War
Islamic Republic of Iran Army brigadier generals
1991 deaths
Golden Crown
Deaths from cancer in Iran
Deaths from leukemia